NGC 7040 Is a spiral galaxy located about 260 million light-years away in the constellation of Equuleus. It has an estimated diameter of 42,600 light-years. NGC 7040 was discovered by astronomer Mark Harrington on August 18, 1882.

See also 
 NGC 7001
 List of NGC objects (7001–7840)

References

External links 
 

Spiral galaxies
Equuleus
7040
11701
66366
Astronomical objects discovered in 1882